Six Months of Life (Spanish:Seis meses de vida) is a 1951 Venezuelan drama film directed by Víctor Urruchúa.

Cast 
 Hermelinda Alvarado
 Amador Bendayan
 Francisco Bernalche
 Aldo Bogni
 América Bravo
 Pedro Contreras
 Camelia Coronado
 Herminia de Martucci
 Lilia del Valle
 Mireya Delgado
 Ildemaro Garcia
 Max Gil
 Helvia Hazz de Zapata
 Norberto Juz
 José Labarrera
 Rafael Lanzetta
 Carlos Latorre
 Edda Margolis
 Carmen Mendoza
 Héctor Monteverde
 Juan Olaguivel
 Saúl Peraza
 Jorge Reyes
 Pedro M. Risson
 Francisco Rodríguez
 Aldemaro Romero
 José Luis Sarzalejo
 Carmen Seyer
 Marco Strodi
 Víctor Urruchúa
 Pura Vargas
 Ramón Zavalsa

References

Bibliography 
 Darlene J. Sadlier. Latin American Melodrama: Passion, Pathos, and Entertainment. University of Illinois Press, 2009.

External links 
 

1951 films
1951 drama films
Venezuelan drama films
1950s Spanish-language films
Venezuelan black-and-white films